Dos Lagunas Airport  is an airstrip near the Biotopo Protegido Naachtun station and archeological site in Peten Department, Guatemala. Dos Lagunas is part of the Maya Biosphere Reserve.

The airstrip is likely closed. Three aerial image sources show the runway completely overgrown.

See also
 
 
 Transport in Guatemala
 List of airports in Guatemala

References

External links
 OpenStreetMap - Dos Lagunas Airport
 OurAirports - Dos Lagunas
 

Airports in Guatemala
Petén Department